Wilbur Heine is a Marshallese politician and government minister. From May 2014 to January 2016 he was Minister in Assistance to the President of Marshall Islands.
As of 2013 he was the Minister for Internal Affairs. Heine has done much work towards the environment, against climate change and disasters in the Marshall Islands.

References

Living people
Year of birth missing (living people)
Ministers in Assistance to the President of Marshall Islands
Government ministers of the Marshall Islands
Marshallese politicians